Bousval is a town of Wallonia and a district of the municipality of Genappe, located in the province of Walloon Brabant, Belgium. Bousval is on the bank of the River Dyle.

Genappe
Former municipalities of Walloon Brabant